Brice Tutu (born 11 January 1998) is a French professional footballer who last played as a forward for Riga FC.

Professional career
On 15 February 2019, Tutu signed his first professional contract with Stade Malherbe Caen for three years. He made his professional debut with Caen in a 0–0 Ligue 2 tie with Sochaux on 26 July 2019.

References

External links
 
 SM Caen Profile
 

1999 births
Living people
Sportspeople from Clichy, Hauts-de-Seine
Footballers from Hauts-de-Seine
Black French sportspeople
French footballers
French sportspeople of Democratic Republic of the Congo descent
Association football forwards
Stade Malherbe Caen players
SC Bastia players
AS Beauvais Oise players
Jeunesse Esch players
FK Auda players
Riga FC players
Ligue 2 players
Championnat National 2 players
Championnat National 3 players
Latvian Higher League players
French expatriate footballers
Expatriate footballers in Luxembourg
French expatriate sportspeople in Luxembourg
Expatriate footballers in Latvia
French expatriate sportspeople in Latvia